Brockia lithotrophica  is a thermophilic bacterium from the genus of Brockia which has been isolated from a sediment-water mixture from a hot spring in Uzon Caldera in Russia. 
This bacterium is rod shaped, spore-forming and obligate anaerobe.

References

 

Bacillota
Thermoanaerobacterales
Bacteria described in 2013
Thermophiles
Anaerobes
Lithoautotrophs